The Awhitu Wind Farm is a renewable energy project in New Zealand initially planned by Tilt Renewables. The development is proposed to be located on the Awhitu Peninsula near Waiuku on the west coast south of Auckland. As of 2016 the project was being privately pursued.

History
The project was initially developed by Genesis Energy with plans for up to 18 wind turbines with a capacity of up to 25 MW.  Maximum height to the tip of the blades was 90m.

In 2004, the wind farm received carbon credits from the New Zealand government, under a scheme to promote renewable energy for electricity generation.  However, local councils denied the application for resource consents.  This project was notable in being one of the few power projects to be denied resource consents.

Genesis Energy appealed to the Environment Court, which, in 2005, granted the resource consents until the year 2015, overturning the decision of the local councils. Genesis subsequently sold development rights to a landowner, who approached Trustpower to progress the project. In 2016, Tilt Renewables demerged from Trustpower. By 2016 the project was being pursued by private development.

A single turbine was erected in 2020.

See also 
Wind power in New Zealand
Electricity sector in New Zealand

References 

Proposed wind farms in New Zealand